Tucker Hollingsworth (born 1984, Boston) is an American photographer primarily known for his conceptual-based projects that engage questions of self-consciousness, distortion, and attention. His photography has been described as "unusually poetic" and blends aesthetic playfulness and technical curiosity. Stylistically, many images are defined by high-keyed, jewel-tone colors and range from semi-representational landscapes to the highly abstract, textured noise images.

List of works

Photo projects 

 Highway (2012)
 Noise (2012)
 Horizons (2011)
 Urban Parkland Series (2009)

Collections 

 Weisman Art Museum (WAM), University of Minnesota, Minneapolis

Fellowships and awards 

 Residency at La Macina di San Cresci, Greve, Italy, 2013
 Lanesboro Arts Center Residency, 2012 
 Virginia Center for the Creative Arts Fellowship, 2012 
 Minnesota State Arts Board, 2012 
 Ragdale Foundation Residency, 2012
 Tofte Lake Center, Jerome Foundation Residency, 2011
 Tofte Lake Center, Jerome Foundation Residency, 2010

References 
 http://blogs.walkerart.org/mnartists/2012/11/15/tucker-hollingsworths-camera-noise-a-primer-by-stephen-tapscott/
 http://www.mnartists.org/article.do?rid=324332
 http://www.minnesotamonthly.com/media/Blogs/Twin-Cities-Culture/October-2012/Ghosts-in-the-Machine/
 Riddle, Mason. "Inside the Camera Noise," Curatorial Essay, November 15, 2012.
 Snediker, Michael D. "Noise," Catalogue, November 1, 2012. (Barrow Street Press, forthcoming).
 Young, Allison. Music with Minnesotans: Tuckaghrie Hollingsworth, Minnesota Public Radio, November 30, 2011.

External links 
 Artist's Website

American photographers
1984 births
Living people